Gmina Leśna Podlaska is a rural gmina (administrative district) in Biała Podlaska County, Lublin Voivodeship, in eastern Poland.

Villages
Gmina Leśna Podlaska contains the villages and settlements of Bukowice, Bukowice-Kolonia, Droblin, Jagodnica, Klukowszczyzna, Leśna Podlaska, Ludwinów, Mariampol, Nosów, Nosów-Kolonia, Nowa Bordziłówka, Ossówka, Ossówka-Kolonia, Stara Bordziłówka, Witulin, Witulin-Kolonia, Worgule and Zaberbecze.

Neighbouring gminas
Gmina Leśna Podlaska is bordered by the gminas of Biała Podlaska, Huszlew, Janów Podlaski, Konstantynów and Stara Kornica.

References

External links
Polish official population figures 2006

Lesna Podlaska
Biała Podlaska County